Grigor Aghekyan (born 6 April 1996) is an Armenian professional footballer.

Career

Club
After leaving Gandzasar Kapan on 5 July 2020, Aghekyan signed a two-year contract with Alashkert on 27 July 2020.

References

External links 
 
 

1996 births
Living people
Armenian footballers
Armenian expatriate footballers
Association football forwards
FC Urartu players
FC Noah players
FC Isloch Minsk Raion players
FC Lori players
FC Gandzasar Kapan players
FC Alashkert players
Armenian expatriate sportspeople in Belarus
Expatriate footballers in Belarus